Astro Prima is a Malaysian pay television channel owned by Astro,  launched on 9 August 2003. It broadcasts Malay dramas, documentaries and classic movies.

Primawara Slot
 Jihad Iskandar
 Perempuan Dalam Pusungan
 Mira Sofea
 Duri
 Keluarga Iskandar S1
 Keluarga Iskandar S2 (moved to Astro Warna and Astro Mustika HD)
 Dia Suamiku
 Sahara
 Halimah Jongang S1
 Halimah Jongang S2
 Aiman Tempe Mania The Series
 Tok Ompek Simpang Ompek
 Nur Melinda
 Tiara
 Sufiyah
 Tanggang Ayu
 Sarafina
 Dari Cinta Jauh
 Adam Dan Hawa (also aired on Astro Maya HD, after end of the episode on Astro Mustika HD, Astro Ria and later begin on Astro Bella)
 Cinta Ibadah (also aired on Astro Maya HD)
 Sehangat Asmara
 Seludup
 Pendekar Durian Lempuk
 Impian Laili
 Jodoh Itu Milik Kita
 Bercakap Dengan Jin S1
 Bercakap Dengan Jin S2
 Kusinero Cinta

Tiara Slot
 Memori Cinta Suraya
 Lara Aishah
 Papa Ricky
 Arluna
 Semusim Rindu
 Dendam Aurora
 Syurga Yang Kedua
 Monalisa

Teleprima Slot
 Antara Safa Dan Marwah
 Bukan Salah Kami
 Dari Kerana Mata
 Warkah Syurga
 DIVA
 Aku Tunggu Kau Ni
 Seteguh Hati Rabiatul Adawiyah

Reality Shows
 Akademi Fantasia 2014 (also aired on Astro Ria and Astro Maya HD) (first episode and grand finale only)
 Ceria Popstar 2 (also aired on Astro Ceria and Astro Maya HD) (grand finale only)
 Maharaja Lawak Mega 2011 (also aired on Astro Mustika HD and Astro Warna)
 Gegar Vaganza (also aired on Astro Ria and Astro Maya HD)
Jeng Jeng Jeng Prankshow 2011(Astro Prima)
 Juara Johan (also aired on Astro Mustika HD) (selected episode only)
 Primadona S1
 Primadona S2
 Primadona S3
 Primadona S4 (also aired on Astro Maya HD)
 Primadona S5
 Kilauan Emas S1
 Kilauan Emas S2
 Kilauan Emas S3
 Kilauan Emas S4 (also aired on Astro Maya HD)
 Kilauan Emas S5 (also aired on Astro Maya HD)
 Sebelum Terlambat
 Motif
 Jaguh Kampung S4
 Kembara Chef Wan S2 (also aired on Astro Maya HD)
 Diari Fakir
 Terima Kasih Ibu
 Menantu vs Mentua
 Raikan Wanita
 Lesung Pipit (Also aired on Astro Maya HD)
 Anugerah Meletop Era 2015 (Also aired on Astro Maya HD and Astro Ria)
 Check In Check Out
 Tua Pun Boleh
 Pengakuan
 Raja Pantun
 Kami Prihatin

Ramadhan Specials 
 Primadona Ramadan Special 2014
 Hajat Ramadan Special 2014
 Dapur Chef Ammar Ramadan Special 2014
 Hajat Ramadan Special 2015
 Cik Bunga Encik Sombong

Hari Raya Specials
 Primadona Khas Syawal 2014
 Dapur Chef Ammar Khas Syawal 2014

Sinetrons
 AlKautsar
 Fitri Buah Hatiku
 Cinta Indah Musim ke 2
 Hafizah
 Dia Bukan Cinderella
 Keangunan Tuhan
 Cowok
 Putih Abu-Abu

Film Bollywood
Coming Soon 2023
" Will be broadcast every Sunday, at 2.00 pm

2023
 Kuch Kuch Hota Hai
 Chori Chori Chupke Chupke
 Har Dil Jo Pyar Karega
 Hum Saathi Saathi Hain
 Kabhi Khushi Kabhie Gham
 Mann
 Chal Mere Bhai
 Bobby
 Raju Chacha
 Dil Kya Kare
 Aa Ab Laut Chalen

External links
 Astro Prima TV Guide

Astro Malaysia Holdings television channels
Television channels and stations established in 2003
Classic television networks